SVH may refer to 

Health
 Stormont Vail Health, a medical facility in Kansas, USA
 Simi Valley Hospital, a Seventh-day adventist hospital in California 
 St. Vincent's Hospital (disambiguation), various hospitals
    
Schools
 Scotts Valley High School, a high school in Scotts Valley, California
 Springvale House, a prep school in Mashonaland East, Zimbabwe

Sports
 SV Heidingsfeld, a football club in Bavaria, Germany
 SV Honselersdijk, a football club in Honselersdijk, Netherlands

Other meanings
 Sweet Valley High, a novel series by Francine Pascal
 Soundtrack for the Voices in My Head, a series of albums by Celldweller
 State Veterans Home, a State established home, approved by the Department of Veterans Affairs